Rodels (Romansh: Roten) is a former municipality in the canton of Graubünden in Switzerland, located in the district of Hinterrhein.  On 1 January 2015 the former municipalities of Almens, Paspels, Pratval, Rodels and Tomils merged to form the new municipality of Domleschg.

History
Rodels is first mentioned in the mid-12th Century as ad Rautine.

Geography

Of this area, 52.4% is used for agricultural purposes, while 31.5% is forested. Of the rest of the land, 11.3% is settled (buildings or roads) and the remainder (4.8%) is non-productive (rivers, glaciers or mountains).

The former municipality is located in the Domleschg sub-district, of the Hinterrhein district.  It consists of a linear village and a haufendorf (an irregular, unplanned and quite closely packed village, built around a central square) as well as the hamlet of Nueins.  The municipality is located on a low terrace on the right side of the Hinterrhein.

Demographics
Rodels had a population (as of 2013) of 267.  , 7.9% of the population was made up of foreign nationals. Between 2000 and 2010, the population number was stable. Between 2010 and 2013, the population has declined by 5%.

, the gender distribution of the population was 50.8% male and 49.2% female.  The age distribution, in Rodels is; 35 people or 12.5% of the population are between 0 and 9 years old.  27 people or 9.6% are 10 to 14, and 17 people or 6.0% are 15 to 19.  Of the adult population, 34 people or 12.1% of the population are between 20 and 29 years old.  52 people or 18.5% are 30 to 39, 46 people or 16.4% are 40 to 49, and 28 people or 10.0% are 50 to 59.  The senior population distribution is 18 people or 6.4% of the population are between 60 and 69 years old, 16 people or 5.7% are 70 to 79, there are 7 people or 2.5% who are 80 to 89, and there are 1 people or 0.4% who are 90 to 99.

In the 2011 federal election the most popular party was the SVP which received 23.6% of the vote.  The next three most popular parties were the BDP (22.1%), SPS (17.8%) and the CVP (15.5%).

In Rodels 80% of the population (between age 25-64) have completed either non-mandatory upper secondary education or additional higher education (either university or a Fachhochschule).

As of 2011, Rodels had an unemployment rate of 1.05%.  , there were 20 people employed in the primary economic sector and about 8 businesses involved in this sector. 6 people are employed in the secondary sector.  23 people are employed in the tertiary sector, with 15 businesses in this sector.

The historical population is given in the following table:

Languages
Most of the population speaks German (90.7%), with Romansh being second most common (3.9%) and Italian being third (1.8%).

Transportation

Rhaetian Railway operate services to Rodels-Realta (Rhaetian Railway station) nearby.

References

External links
 Official Web site

Former municipalities of Graubünden
Populated places disestablished in 2015
2015 disestablishments in Switzerland
Domleschg